Wofford is an unincorporated community and coal town in Whitley County, Kentucky, United States.  It is located approximately three miles north-northeast of Williamsburg on Route 26.

History 
Wofford was initially named Mahan for a local family in residence. When a rural branch of the Williamsburg Post Office was established on April 27, 1900, the community was renamed Wofford. The post office was later closed and reincorporated into the Williamsburg Post Office.

References

Unincorporated communities in Whitley County, Kentucky
Unincorporated communities in Kentucky
Coal towns in Kentucky